The Honeydripper is the third album by American organist Jack McDuff, recorded in 1961 and released on the Prestige label. Guitarist Grant Green, who previously recorded with Sam Lazar, is part of the  line-up, as well as saxophonist Jimmy Forrest.

Reception

Thom Jurek of Allmusic states, "This is an excellent date and should be picked up by anyone interested in McDuff as a great place to start".

Track listing 
All compositions by Jack McDuff except as indicated
 "Whap!" - 4:26     
 "I Want a Little Girl" (Murray Mencher, Billy Moll) - 6:47     
 "The Honeydripper" (Joe Liggins) - 8:14     
 "Dink's Blues" - 7:59     
 "Mr. Lucky" (Henry Mancini) - 5:03     
 "Blues and Tonic" - 5:02

Personnel 
Jack McDuff - organ
Jimmy Forrest - tenor saxophone
Grant Green - guitar
Ben Dixon - drums

References 

Jack McDuff albums
1961 albums
Prestige Records albums
Albums recorded at Van Gelder Studio
Albums produced by Esmond Edwards